Azadegan is an oil field in Iran.

Azadegan may also refer to:

Azadegan, Iran (disambiguation), a list of villages in Iran
Azadegan League, a football league
Azadegan Rural District (disambiguation), an administrative subdivision
Azadegan Organization, an Iranian monarchist organisation

See also
Dasht-e Azadegan (disambiguation)